SS De Klerk was a Dutch passenger-cargo liner owned by NV Koninklijke Paketvaart Mij (KPM) Batavia.

Construction and history

Dutch service 
SS De Klerk was constructed in early 1900 until December 1900 by Netherlandsche SB, in Amsterdam, where she was commissioned not long after. 

In 1928, She was renovated to hold 1,327 passengers aboard. De Klerk was converted to a troop carrier in December 1941. She was scuttled in port by the Royal Dutch Navy in Tanjong Priok, West Malaysia on 2 March 1942 to prevent capture by the Japanese.

Japanese service 
The Japanese found the ship and refloated De Klerk in 1942. They converted her into a prisoner of war Transport ship renamed . She was steaming off to Manila, Philippines, carrying 339 PoWs, slaves and comfort Women who all died when she hit a mine off Labuan, Malaysia at 9:45am and sank quickly after in 1944. The 871 Japanese personal left with all the lifeboats for themselves which led to everyone who was left behind dying.

Sinking 
She lies on the sea bed 21 to 33 meters underwater opposite Labuan and Muara, Brunei. Imbari Maru lies 50 degree list to port. Divers are free to explore the wreck as there are many marine life around it. Lion fish and Frog fish can sometimes be spotted in the wreck. Her wreck was named “The Australian Wreck” which they mistakenly and falsely thought that she was sunk by Royal Australian Air Force on 16 September 1944. The woods on the ship had all rotten away which exposes the cargos inside her such as Chinese crockery and bottles. Her wreck was discovered in 2003 and now being treated as a war grave and tourism site.

References 

Ships of the Imperial Japanese Navy
1900 ships
Steam engine technology
Japan–Netherlands relations
Ships of the Royal Netherlands Navy
Steamships
Steam engines
Auxiliary steamers
Ships sunk by mines
Pacific theatre of World War II
World War II shipwrecks in the South China Sea
Japanese hell ships
Ships built by Nederlandsche Scheepsbouw Maatschappij